Dypsis canaliculata is a species of flowering plant in the family Arecaceae. It is found only in Madagascar, and has not been seen since 1951. It therefore may be extinct. At the times when specimens were collected, they were found far apart geographically (once in Manongarivo, and once in Ampasimanolotra), but both were growing on sandstone in lowland forest regions. To date no flowers from D. canaliculata have ever been collected for science.

References

canaliculata
Plants described in 1924
Endemic flora of Madagascar
Critically endangered plants
Taxonomy articles created by Polbot
Taxa named by Henri Lucien Jumelle